Sum and Substance is a compilation album released by the British rock band The Mission on 7 February 1994 through Vertigo/Phonogram Records. It contains all the singles released by the band as well as two new songs. The vinyl version on two LP's had a slightly different track-listing. A remix of "Tower of Strength" by Youth preceded the release, although it was not included on the compilation. A second single "Afterglow" appeared in March of the same year, but failed to chart. A VHS  with all the music videos produced by the band bears the same title. The band did a short tour around the UK in support of the release.

Track listing

References

1994 compilation albums
The Mission (band) albums
Albums produced by Tim Palmer
Albums produced by Mark Saunders (record producer)